Samuel Ernest Brooks (28 March 1890 – 13 January 1960) was an English footballer who spent the majority of his career with Wolverhampton Wanderers. He played for the club in the 1921 FA Cup Final. After 13 years with Wolves, he joined Tottenham Hotspur in 1922, and later played for Southend United, Cradley Heath, and Kidderminster Harriers, before retiring in 1927.

Career
Brooks was born in Brierley Hill, and played local non-league football before he joined Wolverhampton Wanderers in July 1909. He eventually made his debut on 11 April 1911, in a goalless draw with Bradford Park Avenue. He made only sporadic appearances in his first few seasons before establishing himself in the 1912–13 season, as Wanderers posted a tenth-place finish in the Second Division. He finished the 1913–14 season as the club's top goalscorer with 11 goals. His best season came in 1914–15 when he missed just one game and scored 18 times, his best seasonal tally; the club pushed for promotion, but ended the campaign in fourth place.

During the war he guested for Birmingham, Port Vale and Coventry City. He won a cap from his country in a Victory International in October 1919 and also represented the Football League against the Irish League. He returned to Molineux after the war, as the club struggled at the foot of the Second Division table in 1919–20 and 1920–21. Despite their poor league form, the club put together a series of results in the FA Cup and went on to reach the final. Brooks won a runners-up medal in the 1921 FA Cup Final after a 1–0 defeat to Tottenham Hotspur at Stamford Bridge. Their cup run proved to be a flash-in-the-pan, as they exited the cup in the First Round and continued to struggle in the league in 1921–22.

Brooks signed with Tottenham Hotspur in 1922, having scored 53 goals in 246 league and cup appearances in total for Wolves. However he struggled at White Hart Lane, and scored one goal in only ten First Division appearances in the 1922–23 and 1923–24 seasons. He spent the 1924–25 campaign at Southend United, and scored two goals in 12 Third Division South appearances. He soon dropped into non-league with clubs such as Cradley Heath and Kidderminster Harriers, before retiring in 1927.

Statistics
Source:

Honours
Wolverhampton Wanderers
FA Cup runner-up: 1921

References

1890 births
1960 deaths
English footballers
Association football wingers
Bilston Town F.C. players
Wolverhampton Wanderers F.C. players
Birmingham City F.C. wartime guest players
Port Vale F.C. wartime guest players
Coventry City F.C. wartime guest players
Stoke City F.C. wartime guest players
Tottenham Hotspur F.C. players
Southend United F.C. players
Cradley Heath F.C. players
Kidderminster Harriers F.C. players
English Football League players
FA Cup Final players